Oxyothespis noctivaga is a species of praying mantis in the family Toxoderidae. There are no subspecies.

See also
List of mantis genera and species

References

External links
 https://www.biolib.cz/en/taxon/id968392/

noctivaga
Insects described in 1952